Tom Price (born 12 July 1980 in Hereford) is a British actor, voice-over artist, radio presenter and stand-up comedian originally from Monmouth, Wales. He is most noted for being the creator of hit Channel 4 quiz format Wogan's Perfect Recall and for portraying Andy Davidson in Torchwood.

Acting
Price's comedy career began in 1998 when he co-starred in a revue at Monmouth School, These Charming Men. He continued acting as a student at Warwick University, where he studied English literature. After graduating, he turned down a place at drama school and moved to London. His first TV appearance was playing a waiter in an episode of Absolute Power. He is known to television audiences for being one of the stars of the Five comedy sketch show Swinging. He has also appeared in a recurring role as police officer Andy Davidson in a number of episodes of Torchwood, a spin-off from the long running science fiction series Doctor Who. In 2008 he starred in the BBC Three sketch show The Wrong Door and filmed the role of Darrin Stephens in a pilot UK remake of Bewitched, which never got aired. Other TV appearances include Doctors (2009) and Secret Diary of a Call Girl (2010). Price also featured in Renault TV's program The Key. In 2011 Price reprised the role of Andy Davidson in Torchwood: Miracle Day, airing on BBC One and US premium television network Starz.

In addition to his TV performances Price has appeared in the films The Boat that Rocked and Hereafter.

In 2011 he appeared in an 8-part comedy reality series called World Series of Dating on BBC3 with Rob Riggle. He was most recently a regular alongside Ruth Jones in Stella and appeared in recent series of Count Arthur Strong and Episodes.

Comedy
Price often performs as a stand-up comedian across the UK and internationally.

He took his debut stand-up show, Say When, to the Edinburgh Festival in 2011, and a reviewer described his comedic style as "easygoing, good-natured autobiographical".

He returned to Edinburgh in 2014 with his show "Not as Nice as He Looks", which was described by one reviewer as "refreshing, innovative and frighteningly funny".

In Autumn 2014, Tom supported Stephen Merchant on his European Tour.

Radio
Price appeared as Gordon, a young drunken doctor, in the BBC Radio 4 comedy show Rigor Mortis for three series, alongside Peter Davison, Geoffrey Whitehead, Matilda Ziegler and, for series one, Tracy-Ann Oberman. His radio credits also include the Torchwood Radio Play Asylum, in which he reprised his role as Andy.

He hosts the BBC Radio Wales comedy news show "The Leak with Tom Price", which began in September 2014. Prior to that, he regularly hosted the topical comedy radio show What's the Story? on the same station.

In October 2016 Tom became the weekend afternoon host on Magic Radio.

From September 2017 Tom became the weekend breakfast show host on Magic Radio (6am10am), taking over from Harriet Scott who was to become the new weekday breakfast show host alongside Ronan Keating.

Other work
Price was also one of the presenters of BBC3's Destination Three. He also presented Senseless on MTV. In 2014 he narrated the ITV1 documentary "Quads". In advertising he has appeared in Velvet Triple Soft and Trident "Mastication for the Nation" adverts, and has been the voice of Nescafe. He has performed in a Virgin Atlantic advert and appeared in jingles on the comedy podcast Answer Me This!. He has also played the part of the PG Tips' Monkey. He has also reprised his role as Andy Davidson in 
a number of Torchwood audio stories produced by Big Finish Productions.

Price is the host of the podcast My Mate Bought a Toaster, in which he discusses a celebrity guest's Amazon purchase history. Since the start of the COVID-19 lockdowns in the UK, Price has hosted the podcast Cabin Fever alongside Dave Cribb and Helen Monks. Originally released five times a week, it later changed to weekly episodes.

Filmography

References

External links
Official website
Magic Weekend Breakfast with Tom Price on Magic Radio
School Disco with Tom Price on Magic Radio

Living people
1980 births
People educated at Monmouth School for Boys
Welsh male television actors
Welsh male comedians
Welsh radio presenters
People from Monmouth, Wales